Émile Chautemps (2 May 1850, in Valleiry, then in the Kingdom of Sardinia – 10 December 1918, in Paris) was a French politician.

Sources
http://www.assemblee-nationale.fr/sycomore/fiche.asp?num_dept=1727

People from Sardinia
French people of Italian descent
French Naval Ministers
1850 births
1918 deaths
Senators of Haute-Savoie